Nicolas Séjan (17 March 1745 – 16 March 1819) was a French composer and organist, from a family allied to the Forqueray.

Born in Paris, Séjan was one of the best organists of his time. He was co-titular of the organ of Notre-Dame de Paris and many other Parisian churches. He was appointed to the Chapelle Royale in 1789. He lost his charges during the French Revolution, but later recovered some of them.

He left a few works for the harpsichord and the pianoforte as well as the organ.

Nicolas Séjan was Louis-Nicolas Séjan's father, his successor at the church of Saint-Sulpice.

He died in Paris on 16 March 1819 and was buried at Montmartre Cemetery.

See also 
 French organ school

References

External links 
 
 Noël suisse on data.bnf.fr
 Swiss Noel - Nicolas Séjan on YouTube
 Nicolas Séjan on isni.org
 Biographie sur le site "Musica et Memoria"
 Nicolas Séjan on IdRef
 Nicolas Séjan on Musicalics

French classical composers
French male classical composers
French classical organists
French male organists
Academic staff of the Conservatoire de Paris
1745 births
Musicians from Paris
1819 deaths
Burials at Montmartre Cemetery
Male classical organists